Kevin Gilbert "Big Bird" Restani (December 23, 1951 – April 25, 2010) was an American professional basketball player from San Francisco, California.

After being selected by the Cleveland Cavaliers in the 1974 NBA draft, Restani played in eight seasons with the Milwaukee Bucks, New York Knicks, San Antonio Spurs, and Cavaliers. While with the Spurs, he was a member of the "Bruise Brothers" along with George Johnson, Paul Griffin, Dave Corzine, and Mark Olberding.

Restani was a catholic.

In more recent years he was a high school counselor at Balboa High School in San Francisco.

Restani died of a heart attack on April 25, 2010.

Career statistics

Regular season

|-
| align="left" | 1974–75
| align="left" | Milwaukee
| 76 || - || 23.1 || .440 || - || .714 || 5.3 || 1.6 || 0.5 || 0.3 || 5.4
|-
| align="left" | 1975–76
| align="left" | Milwaukee
| 82 || - || 20.1 || .475 || - || .571 || 4.6 || 1.2 || 0.4 || 0.1 || 6.0
|-
| align="left" | 1976–77
| align="left" | Milwaukee
| 64 || - || 17.4 || .518 || - || .500 || 4.1 || 1.4 || 0.5 || 0.2 || 5.6
|-
| align="left" | 1977–78
| align="left" | Milwaukee
| 8 || - || 10.5 || .464 || - || .000 || 1.8 || 1.1 || 0.0 || 0.1 || 3.3
|-
| align="left" | 1977–78
| align="left" | Kansas City
| 46 || - || 10.1 || .424 || - || .818 || 2.0 || 0.5 || 0.1 || 0.1 || 2.8
|-
| align="left" | 1978–79
| align="left" | Milwaukee
| 81 || - || 19.7 || .495 || - || .699 || 4.8 || 1.5 || 0.4 || 0.3 || 7.1
|-
| align="left" | 1979–80
| align="left" | San Antonio
| 82 || - || 24.0 || .508 || .172 || .814 || 4.7 || 2.3 || 0.7 || 0.1 || 10.7
|-
| align="left" | 1980–81
| align="left" | San Antonio
| 64 || - || 15.6 || .520 || .375 || .705 || 2.7 || 1.3 || 0.3 || 0.2 || 7.0
|-
| align="left" | 1981–82
| align="left" | San Antonio
| 13 || 0 || 11.2 || .321 || .000 || .750 || 2.7 || 0.5 || 0.1 || 0.3 || 1.6
|-
| align="left" | 1981–82
| align="left" | Cleveland
| 34 || 0 || 9.9 || .383 || .000 || .583 || 2.3 || 0.4 || 0.3 || 0.2 || 1.6
|- class="sortbottom"
| style="text-align:center;" colspan="2"| Career
| 550 || 0 || 18.4 || .486 || .205 || .717 || 4.0 || 1.4 || 0.4 || 0.2 || 6.2
|}

Playoffs

|-
| align="left" | 1975–76
| align="left" | Milwaukee
| 3 || - || 11.0 || .200 || - || .000 || 1.7 || 0.3 || 0.3 || 0.0 || 0.7
|-
| align="left" | 1979–80
| align="left" | San Antonio
| 3 || - || 24.7 || .607 || .000 || .444 || 5.3 || 1.0 || 0.0 || 0.3 || 12.7
|-
| align="left" | 1980–81
| align="left" | San Antonio
| 3 || - || 3.7 || .333 || .000 || .000 || 0.7 || 0.0 || 0.0 || 0.3 || 0.7
|- class="sortbottom"
| style="text-align:center;" colspan="2"| Career
| 9 || - || 13.1 || .528 || .000 || .444 || 2.6 || 0.4 || 0.1 || 0.2 || 4.7
|}

References

External links
Career stats at basketball-reference.com

1951 births
2010 deaths
American expatriate basketball people in Italy
American men's basketball players
Basketball players from California
Centers (basketball)
Cleveland Cavaliers draft picks
Cleveland Cavaliers players
Kansas City Kings players
Milwaukee Bucks players
Power forwards (basketball)
San Antonio Spurs players
San Francisco Dons men's basketball players